Rolston James (21 December 1975 - 16 December 2002) was a Trinidadian international football player.

He played club football for W Connection and was involved in the club's 2002 CFU Club Championship campaign.

Prior to signing for W Connection, he had a five-month spell with Happy Valley between December 2001 and April 2002 in Hong Kong, scoring five goals during his time there.

He played twice for Trinidad and Tobago, his début came against Cuba on 4 July 2000. His second and final game would come against Grenada on 27 January 2001.

In December 2002 he was shot dead in his apartment at the age of 26.

References 

1975 births
People from Tobago
Trinidad and Tobago footballers
Trinidad and Tobago international footballers
San Juan Jabloteh F.C. players
W Connection F.C. players
Happy Valley AA players
2002 deaths
Association footballers not categorized by position